Bullseye cardinalfish is a common name for several fishes and may refer to:

Apogonichthyoides nigripinnis
Ostorhinchus fleurieu